"I Can Talk" is a song by Northern Irish band Two Door Cinema Club from their debut studio album Tourist History (2010). The song was released on 20 November 2009 as the album's second single and peaked to number 135 on the UK Singles Chart. The song was written by Alex Trimble, Kevin Baird, Sam Halliday and produced by Eliot James. The song is also featured in the video games NBA 2K11, FIFA 11 and MotionSports: Adrenaline.

Music video
A music video to accompany the release of "I Can Talk" was first released onto YouTube on 4 November 2009 at a total length of two minutes and fifty-one seconds.

Track listing
Digital download
 "I Can Talk" – 2:57
 "Costume Party" – 3:27

Credits and personnel
Lead vocals – Two Door Cinema Club
Producers – Eliot James
Lyrics – Alex Trimble, Kevin Baird, Sam Halliday
Label: Kitsuné

Charts

Certifications

Release history

References

2009 singles
Two Door Cinema Club songs
2009 songs
Kitsuné singles